Bernhardt "Ben" Klassen ( (O.S. February 7, 1918) – ) was an American politician and white supremacist religious leader. He founded the Church of the Creator with the publication of his book Nature's Eternal Religion in 1973. Klassen was openly racist, antisemitic and anti-Christian and first popularized the term "Racial Holy War" within the White Power movement.

At one point, Klassen was a Republican Florida state legislator, as well as a supporter of George Wallace's presidential campaign. In addition to his religious and political work, Klassen was an electrical engineer and he was also the inventor of a wall-mounted electric can-opener. Klassen held unorthodox views about dieting and health. He was a natural hygienist who opposed the germ theory of disease as well as conventional medicine and promoted a fruitarian, raw food diet.

Early life 

Klassen was born on February 20, 1918, in Rudnerweide (now Rozivka in Chernihivka Raion in Zaporizhzhia Oblast), Ukraine, to Bernhard and Susanna Klassen (née Friesen) a Ukrainian Mennonite Christian couple. He had two sisters and two brothers. When Klassen was nine months old, he caught typhoid fever and nearly died. Due to the Russian Civil War, circumstances during his early childhood were quite difficult. When he was five, the family moved to Mexico, where they lived for one year. In 1925, at age six, he moved with his family to Herschel, Saskatchewan, Canada. He attended the German-English Academy (now Rosthern Junior College).

Entrepreneurship
Klassen established a real estate firm in Los Angeles in partnership with Ben Burke. Believing that his partner was prone to drinking and gambling, Klassen eventually bought him out and became sole proprietor. He hired several salesmen, including Merle Peek, who convinced him to buy large land development projects in Nevada. Klassen and Peek started a partnership called the Silver Springs Land Company, through which they founded the town of Silver Springs, Nevada. In 1952, Klassen sold his share of the company to Phillip Hess for $150,000 and retired.

On March 26, 1956, Klassen filed an application with the U.S. Patent Office to patent a wall-mounted, electric can opener which he marketed as Canolectric. In partnership with the marketing firm Robbins & Myers, Klassen created Klassen Enterprises, Inc. In the face of competition from larger manufacturers that could provide similar products more cheaply, Klassen and his partners dissolved the company in 1962.

Political career
Klassen served Broward County in the Florida House of Representatives from November 1966 – March 1967, running on an anti-busing, anti-government platform. He campaigned for election to the Florida Senate in 1967, but was defeated. That same year, he was vice chairman of an organization in Florida which supported George Wallace's presidential bid.

Klassen was a member of the John Birch Society, at one point operating an American Opinion bookstore, but became disillusioned with the Society because of what he viewed as its tolerant position towards Jews. In November 1970, Klassen, along with Austin Davis, created the Nationalist White Party. The party's platform was directed at White Christians and it was explicitly religious and racial in nature; the first sentence of the party's fourteen-point program is "We believe that the White Race was created in the Image of the Lord." The logo of the Nationalist White Party was a "W" with a crown and a halo over it, and it would be used three years later as the logo of the Church of the Creator.

Less than a year after he created the Nationalist White Party, Klassen began expressing apprehension about Christianity to his connections through letters. These letters were not well received, and they effectively ended the influence of the Nationalist White Party.

Church of the Creator

In 1973, Klassen founded the Church of the Creator (COTC) with the publication of Nature's Eternal Religion. Individual church members are called Creators, and the religion they practice is called Creativity.

In 1982, Klassen established the headquarters of his church in Otto, North Carolina. Klassen wrote that he established a school for boys. The original curriculum was a two-week summer program that included activities such as "hiking, camping, training in handling of firearms, archery, tennis, white water rafting and other healthy outdoor activities", as well as instruction on "the goals and doctrines of Creativity and how they could best serve their own race in various capacities of leadership."

In July 1992, George Loeb, a minister in the church, was convicted  of murdering a black sailor in Jacksonville, Florida. Fearing that a conviction might mean the loss of 20 acres of land worth about $400,000 in Otto, North Carolina, belonging to the church, Klassen sold it to another white supremacist, William Luther Pierce, author of the Turner Diaries, for $100,000.

Klassen self-appointed himself Pontifex Maximus of the church until January 25, 1993, when he transferred the title to Dr. Rick McCarty.

Racial holy war
Ben Klassen first popularized the term "Racial Holy War" (RaHoWa) within the white nationalist movement. He also consistently called black people "niggers" in public discourse as well as in the literature of the COTC, as opposed to many white nationalist leaders who use relatively more polite terms in public. Klassen wrote, "Furthermore, in looking up the word in Webster's dictionary I found the term 'nigger' very descriptive: 'a vulgar, offensive term of hostility and contempt for the black man'. I can't think of anything that defines better and more accurately what our position... should be...  If we are going to be for racial integrity and racial purity... we must take a hostile position toward the nigger. We must give him nothing but contempt."

In his 1987 book Rahowa – This Planet Is All Ours he claims that Jews created Christianity in order to make white people weaker, and he said that the first priority should be to "smash the Jewish Behemoth".

Personal beliefs

Klassen was a natural hygienist who promoted a back to nature philosophy that espoused fresh air, clean water, sunshine and outdoor exercise. He recommended a raw food diet which consisted of fruits and vegetables and believed that medicine and processed foods create cancer inside the body. Klassen wrote that food must be "uncooked, unprocessed, unpreserved and not tampered with in any other way. This further means it must be organically grown without the use of chemicals."

Klassen promoted "racial health" and natural hygiene principles, and he was influenced by the works of Herbert M. Shelton. Klassen believed that fasting would cleanse the body of toxins, and he also believed that a fruitarian raw food diet would cure disease. Klassen rejected the germ theory of disease and believed that modern medicine was a Jewish multi-billion-dollar fraud. Klassen contributed an introduction and a chapter on eugenics to Arnold DeVries' book Salubrious Living (1982). The book endorsed fasting, sunbathing, fruitarian and raw food dieting. Historian George Michael has written that "despite his advocacy of healthy nutrition, some of his associates claimed that in practice Klassen did not actually follow the "salubrious living" regimen, because he often ate red meat and ice cream."

Klassen firmly opposed religion because he believed it was superstitious, and he described Christianity as a "Jewish creation" which was designed to unhinge white people by promoting a "completely perverted attitude" about life and nature. He rejected the afterlife as "nonsense". He argued that man's morality and sense of purpose is based on the laws of nature and racial loyalty. Klassen believed that the white race was the sole builder of civilization and all of the advanced civilizations which existed in antiquity were created by white people but they were destroyed because they practiced miscegenation.

Death 

Possibly depressed after the death of his wife, the failure of his church and a diagnosis of cancer and considering suicide a suitable way to end his life, Klassen took an overdose of sleeping pills either late on August 6 or early on August 7, 1993. Klassen was buried on his North Carolina property in an area which he had previously designated "Ben Klassen Memorial Park".

Selected publications

Natures Eternal Religion (1973)
The White Man's Bible (1981)
Salubrious Living (with Arnold DeVries, 1982)
Expanding Creativity (1985)
Building a Whiter and Brighter World (1986)
On the Brink of a Bloody Racial War (1993)

References

Further reading

George Michael. (2009). Chapter 5: Groundbreaking in North Carolina. In Theology Of Hate: A History of the World Church of the Creator. University Press of Florida. 

1918 births
1993 suicides
20th-century American engineers
20th-century American inventors
20th-century American politicians
American city founders
American electrical engineers
American eugenicists
American fascists
American former Christians
American politicians who committed suicide
American real estate businesspeople
American white supremacists
Antisemitism in the United States
Canadian emigrants to the United States
Creativity (religion)
Critics of Christianity
Critics of Judaism
Drug-related suicides in North Carolina
Fascist politicians
Fasting advocates
Founders of new religious movements
Germ theory denialists
John Birch Society members
Republican Party members of the Florida House of Representatives
Orthopaths
People from Broward County, Florida
People from Zaporizhzhia Oblast
People from Macon County, North Carolina
Pseudoscientific diet advocates
Raw foodists
Ukrainian emigrants to Canada
Ukrainian people of German descent
University of Manitoba alumni
University of Saskatchewan alumni